The Fifth Commandment  is a 1978 Italian-German drama film directed by Duccio Tessari.

Cast 
 Helmut Berger as Bernhard Redder
 Peter Hooten as Leo Redder
 Evelyne Kraft as Evelyn Pages
 Umberto Orsini as Vater Redder
 Udo Kier as Peter Dümmel
 Kurt Zips as Atsche Kummer
 Heinrich Giskes as Rudi Linnemann
 Lorella De Luca as Mutter Redder

References

External links

1978 films
1978 crime drama films
Films about brothers
Films directed by Duccio Tessari
Films scored by Armando Trovajoli
Films set in Germany
Films set in the 1920s
German crime drama films
Italian crime drama films
West German films
Constantin Film films
1970s Italian films
1970s German films